Ariel Behar and Fabiano de Paula were the defending champions but chose not to defend their title.

Guido Andreozzi and Guillermo Durán won the title after defeating Marcelo Demoliner and Andrés Molteni 6–4, 4–6, [10–3] in the final.

Seeds

Draw

References
 Main Draw

Challenger de Buenos Aires - Doubles
2018 Doubles